USS Champion was a small gunboat originally built as the commercial vessel Champion No. 4 in Cincinnati, Ohio in 1859. She was purchased for the Union Navy in 1863 during the American Civil War, serving until July 1865, when she was sold back to civilian service.

Service history
Champion, an armed river steamer, was built in Cincinnati, Ohio, in 1859 as Champion No. 4; purchased there on 14 March 1863; fitted out at Cairo, Illinois; and commissioned on 26 April 1863, Acting Master Alfred Phelps, Jr., in command. Operating almost continuously from 27 April 1863 – 9 June 1865, Champion patrolled the Mississippi River, Tennessee River, and the Red River. She transported troops, prisoners, supplies, and cotton; towed and convoyed ships; and delivered dispatches. Her yeoman service ended at Mound City, Illinois, where she was decommissioned on 1 July. Champion was sold 29 November 1865.

References

Steamships of the United States Navy
Ships built in Cincinnati
Ships of the Union Navy
Gunboats of the United States Navy
1859 ships